Maybag Island (also Mabaag Island or Mabog Island) is an island in the municipality of Aparri, Philippines. It is one of the islands of the Babuyan Island group, It is 6 metres above sea level.

References 

Babuyan Islands